Stojnik may refer to:

 Stojnik (Aranđelovac), a village in Serbia
 Stojnik (Sopot), a village in Serbia